Jean-Baptiste-Boniface de Fortis (1763–1848) was a French politician. After serving in the Parliament of Aix-en-Provence during the Ancien Régime, he was exiled during the French Revolution and later returned to France, where he served as the Mayor of Aix-en-Provence from 1806 to 1808 and from 1809 to 1811.

Biography

Early life
Jean-Baptiste-Boniface de Fortis was born on June 19, 1763 in Aix-en-Provence. He was baptised in the Église de la Madeleine a day later. His father was François-Boniface de Fortis and his mother, Marie-Marguerite Désirée de Moricaud Soleilhas.

Career
From 1782 to 1798, during the Ancien Régime, he served as an Advisor in the Parliament of Aix-en-Provence, a position he had inherited from his father. In 1790, during the French Revolution, he left France to avoid being guillotined. When he returned in 1801, he was appointed as Head of hospices in Aix. He was also in charge of taking care of children who had been orphaned as a result of the French Revolution. He then served as the Mayor of Aix-en-Provence from 1806 to 1808 and from 1809 to 1811.

In 1814, he was appointed as Secretary General of the Prefecture of the Seine in Paris. He became a Knight of the Legion of Honour in 1814, and finally an Officer in 1821, for his public service.

Personal life
On August 19, 1788, he married Gabrielle Françoise d'André de Bellevue, daughter of Jacques Joseph Gabriel Benoît and Anne Jeanne Françoise Payan de Saint-Martin, in the Église de la Madeleine. They resided at number 7 on the rue des Trois-Ormeaux in Aix. They had four children:
Gabrielle de Fortis (1790-1868).
Antoine Boniface Victor de Fortis (1791-1792).
Marie Julie Joséphine de Fortis (1791-1880).
Boniface François de Fortis (1799-1879).
Désirée Joséphine Maxime de Fortis (1803-1803).

He died on September 12, 1848 in Aix-en-Provence.

References

1746 births
1836 deaths
Mayors of Aix-en-Provence
French jurists
Provencal nobility
19th-century jurists